Mohammed Ali Abbood Suwaed (born 1 October 2000) is an Iraqi footballer who plays as a midfielder for Iraqi Premier League club Al-Quwa Al-Jawiya and the Iraqi national team.

Club career

Al-Sinaat Al-Kahrabaiya
Mohammed joined Iraqi Premier League club Al-Sinaat Al-Kahrabaiya in September 2017 from Iraq Division One side Al-Najda.

Al-Quwa Al-Jawiya
In September 2018, Abbood signed for Iraqi club Al-Quwa Al-Jawiya. He started the 2018 AFC Cup Final as Jawiya won the tournament for the third successive year. Ali Abbood made his AFC Champions League debut on 12 February 2019, against Uzbek side Pakhtakor.

International career

Youth
Mohammed's first international call up came in 2015 with the Iraq U16s for the 2016 AFC U-16 Championship qualifiers. He was included in the final squad for the tournament and helped Iraq win their first-ever tournament.

Abbood was called up to the Iraq U17s for the 2017 FIFA U-17 World Cup as Iraq were eliminated in the knockout round.

Senior
In October 2021, Mohammed was called up to the senior national team for the first time for the 2022 World Cup qualifiers against Lebanon and the United Arab Emirates. He made his debut against Lebanon on 7 October 2021.

Honours

Club
Al-Quwa Al-Jawiya
 Iraqi Premier League: 2020–21
 Iraq FA Cup: 2020–21
 Iraqi Super Cup runner-up: 2021
 AFC Cup: 2018

International
Iraq U16
 AFC U-16 Championship: 2016
Iraq
 Arabian Gulf Cup: 2023

References

External links
 

2000 births
Living people
Iraqi footballers
Association football midfielders
Al-Quwa Al-Jawiya players
Iraqi Premier League players
Iraq youth international footballers
Iraq international footballers
Sportspeople from Baghdad